Plicaria is a genus of fungi within the Pezizaceae family. The genus contains about 10 species, widely distributed in temperate areas.

Species
Species include:
Plicaria carbonaria
Plicaria endocarpoides
Plicaria trachycarpa

References

Pezizaceae
Pezizales genera
Taxa named by Karl Wilhelm Gottlieb Leopold Fuckel